Marie-Jo and Her Two Lovers is a 2002 French drama film directed by Robert Guédiguian. It was entered into the 2002 Cannes Film Festival.

Cast
 Ariane Ascaride as Marie-Jo
 Jean-Pierre Darroussin as Daniel
 Gérard Meylan as Marco
 Julie-Marie Parmentier as Julie
 Jacques Boudet as Jean-Christophe
 Yann Trégouët as Sylvain
 Frédérique Bonnal as Mrs. Fauvelet
 Souhade Temimi as La collègue de Marie-Jo
 Maya Seuleyvan as La dame à la minerve (as Maya Sevleyan)
 Frédéric Garbe as Le toubib
 Danielle Stefan as L'invitée à la fête
 Jacques Germain as Le pilote
 Axel Köhler as Le commandant allemand (as Alex Koehler)

Accolades

References

External links

2002 films
French drama films
2000s French-language films
2002 drama films
Films set in Marseille
Films directed by Robert Guédiguian
2000s French films